Ruwen Faller (born 22 July 1980, in Rheinfelden) is a German sprinter who specializes in the 400 metres.

His personal best time is 45.74 seconds, achieved in July 1999 in Erfurt.

Achievements

References

1980 births
Living people
People from Rheinfelden (Baden)
Sportspeople from Freiburg (region)
German male sprinters
Olympic athletes of Germany
Athletes (track and field) at the 2004 Summer Olympics
Athletes (track and field) at the 2008 Summer Olympics